"Blessed" is a song by American rapper GloRilla, released on August 31, 2022 as the third single form her debut EP Anyways, Life's Great...	 (2022). The song features uncredited vocals from American rapper Yo Gotti and was produced by Macaroni Toni.

Composition
Built on a "sparse but hard-hitting beat", the song sees GloRilla rapping about her newfound success and her appreciation for it. In her verse, she asserts she would "rather give the people hope" because "it's pointless to be giving fucks", has moved to the suburbs though maintaining her "ratchet tendencies", and focuses on taking care of people. Yo Gotti details his own successes in the second verse.

Critical reception
Tom Breihan of Stereogum gave a positive review, writing, "She's great at tough, direct Memphis rap, and her deep, rich voice sounds amazing. Yo Gotti has been in the game for decades, but when he shows up on 'Blessed,' he and Glorilla sound like peers."

Music video
Directed by Louie Knows, the music video sees GloRilla hosting a tea party for old ladies, which soon turns into a "more up-beat" party.

Charts

References

2022 singles
2022 songs
GloRilla songs
Yo Gotti songs
Songs written by GloRilla
Songs written by Yo Gotti
Interscope Records singles
Collective Music Group singles